Heldur is an Estonian-language male given name.

People named Heldur include:
 Heldur Jõgioja (1936–2010), Estonian musician, composer, writer, journalist

References

Estonian masculine given names